Hong Kong Heritage Museum is a museum of history, art and culture in Sha Tin, Hong Kong, located beside the Shing Mun River. The museum opened on 16 December 2000. It is managed by the Leisure and Cultural Services Department of the Hong Kong Government. The six permanent exhibits and the original temporary exhibits were designed by design firm Reich+Petch along with Lord Cultural Resources.

The museum building is the largest in Hong Kong, and can accommodate up to 6,000 visitors.

Features

The Museum has been designed to provide comprehensive exhibitions on history, art and culture. The Museum has a number of interactive exhibitions and programmes. It also houses a cafe and museum shop.

There are six permanent exhibition galleries for the display of the museum's collections and six thematic galleries for temporary exhibitions. Permanent galleries include:
 New Territories Heritage Hall (closed in June 2016)
 Children's Discovery Gallery
 Cantonese Opera Heritage Hall
 T.T.Tsui Gallery of Chinese Art, displaying artifacts from the former Tsui Museum of Art
 Chao Shao-an Gallery
 Jin Yong Gallery Gallery (opened on 1 March 2017)

Other than galleries, the museum has a 350-seat theatre for various performing arts and talks, including regular Cantonese opera performance. The museum possesses over 30,000 items related to Cantonese opera, which is a designated intangible cultural heritage of Hong Kong and the region.

Gallery

Branch museums
The museum runs three branch museums:
 Hong Kong Railway Museum (Tai Po Market, Tai Po District)
 Sam Tung Uk Museum (in a former Hakka walled village, Tsuen Wan, Tsuen Wan District)
 Sheung Yiu Folk Museum (in a former Hakka village, Sheung Yiu, Sai Kung District)

Transport
The museum is served by numerous bus lines. It is also within walking distance of several MTR railway stations:
 East Rail line: 15-minute walk from either Tai Wai or Sha Tin station
 Tuen Ma line: 5-minute walk across the river from Che Kung Temple station

See also
 Museums in Hong Kong
 History of Hong Kong
 Culture of Hong Kong
 Heritage conservation in Hong Kong
 Hong Kong Heritage Discovery Centre
 Hong Kong Museum of History

References

External links
Virtual tour of the Hong Kong Heritage Museum provided by Google Arts & Culture

Museums in Hong Kong
Sha Tin
Tai Wai
Rural history museums in Asia
Living museums
Art museums and galleries in Hong Kong
Local museums in China
Art museums established in 2000
2000 establishments in Hong Kong